Ronald A. Everson (born July 8, 1930) is an American politician in the state of Minnesota. He served in the Minnesota House of Representatives from 1961–1962, 1963–1966, and 1967–1970. He was an automobile dealer.

References

1930 births
Living people
People from Brainerd, Minnesota
People from Wadena, Minnesota
Businesspeople from Minnesota
University of Minnesota alumni
Members of the Minnesota House of Representatives